Halonen is a Finnish surname of Savonian origin. Notable people with the surname include:

Antti Halonen (b. 1982), ice hockey defenceman
Arne Halonen (1898–1986), Finnish-American journalist and university teacher
Arto Halonen (b. 1964), documentary filmmaker
Brian Halonen (born 1999), American ice hockey player
Eemil Halonen (1875-1950), sculptor
George Halonen (1891–1954), Finnish-American journalist and cooperative organizer
Kaija Halonen (b. 1954), ski orienteering competitor
Niilo Halonen (b. 1940), ski jumper
Paavali Halonen (1565–1642), warlord and settler in the 16th century 
Pekka Halonen (1865–1933), painter
Simo Halonen (b. 1947), biathlete
Tarja Halonen (b. 1943), former President of Finland
Yrjö Halonen (1862–1941), politician

Finnish-language surnames